"" (from the native name of Puerto Rico, Borinquen or Boriquen)) is the official anthem of Puerto Rico. 

After Puerto Rico became known as "The Commonwealth of Puerto Rico" in 1952, the first elected governor, Luis Muñoz Marín, signed law #2 of July 24, 1952, which made an altered version of the musical composition known as "La Borinqueña" its national anthem. The words that go with the composition were approved by governor Carlos Romero Barceló on July 27, 1977, as per law #123.

Etymology
The title refers to the aboriginal Taíno name for the island of Puerto Rico, .

History

The music was originally credited to Félix Astol Artés in 1867 as a habanera danza, with romantic lyrics, but there is some evidence that Francisco Ramírez, a native of San Germán, wrote the music in 1860, and named it "La Almojábana". In 1868, Lola Rodríguez de Tió wrote a poem in support of the Puerto Rican revolution, which was set to the Ramírez/Astol music. In fear of investigation by the Spanish government, Ramírez asked Astol to claim authorship of the music since he was a native of Catalonia and would, therefore, raise no suspicion.

After the cession of the island to the United States, the popular revolutionary lyrics of Lola Rodríguez de Tió were deemed too subversive for official adoption; therefore, a non-confrontational set of lyrics were written in 1903 by Asturias-born Manuel Fernández Juncos. The tune was officially adopted as Puerto Rico's national anthem in 1952 by governor Luis Muñoz Marín, and the words were adopted in 1977 by governor Carlos Romero Barceló.

The version of "La Borinqueña" that is most commonly performed today is performed as a slow-tempo march, without the original tune's initial paseo. Per the request of the new government, Ramón Collado rearranged the music in 1952 into a more military-like tune. Luis Miranda, the musical director of Puerto Rico's 65th Infantry Regiment Band, adapted the tune to be played as a march in 1922. The 1977 law that officially adopted the words merely stated that "La Borinqueña" be played as a march, with the tempo vaguely described as being in a "martial manner", but established no official arrangement for the music. An official revision made in 2003 leaves the tune as a march.

In 2012, Dr. Yajaira Sierra Sastre, an aspiring astronaut, collaborated in a variety of projects with the National Nanotechnology Infrastructure Network and the Cornell Nanoscale Facility, which included writing the smallest "national" anthem ever written, "La Borinqueña Más Pequeña".

According to Puerto Rico Law # 2 of July 24, 1952, both "La Borinqueña" and "The Star-Spangled Banner" are played at official events. During international sports competitions such as the Olympics, only "La Borinqueña" is played.

The anthem, with its revolutionary lyrics, was featured in Steven Spielberg's 2021 film adaptation of the stage musical West Side Story, sung by the Puerto Rican gang, the Sharks, early in the film. It was never used in the stage version nor its 1961 film adaptation prior to this film.

Lyrics

Current lyrics
The following are the current lyrics, as written by Manuel Fernández Juncos and adopted in 1903.

Original 1868 revolutionary lyrics

Short version 
A short version of the revolutionary lyrics is sometimes sung, consisting of the first half of the first verse and the second half of the third verse.

Notes

References

External links

MIDI version

Anthems of insular areas of the United States
History of Puerto Rico
Regional songs
National symbols of Puerto Rico
North American anthems
National anthem compositions in B-flat major
Songs about Puerto Rico
Spanish-language songs